Lux Aeterna is an album by guitarist Terje Rypdal recorded in 2000 and released on the ECM label.

Reception
The Allmusic review by Thom Jurek awarded the album 4½ stars stating "There is nothing remotely cold about this work; it is warm and dark and stunning in its stark presentation that is so deceptively complex. By the time the fifth and title movement commences, the listener has been to many worlds within the sonorous terrains of the heart... Terje Rypdal is making the greatest music of his life".

Track listing
All compositions by Terje Rypdal
 "1st Movement: Luminous Galaxy" - 15:51   
 "2nd Movement: Orchestral Interlude" - 11:28   
 "3rd Movement: Fjelldåpen" - 7:22   
 "4th Movement: Organ Interlude" - 10:44   
 "5th Movement: Lux Aeterna" - 15:20

Personnel 
Terje Rypdal — electric guitar
Palle Mikkelborg — trumpet
Iver Kleive — church organ
Åshild Stubø Gundersen — soprano
Bergen Chamber Ensemble conducted by Kjell Seim
Double Bass – Adam Kieszek
Cello – Bodil Erdal & Gunn Berit Kleiveland
Percussion – Ellen Bredesen-Vestby & Ivar Kolve
Piano – Thorstein Tellnes
Viola – Anders Rensvik, Hans Gunnar Hagen & Nils Olav Solberg
First Violin – Elise Båtnes (leader), Annar Follesø, Ellisiv Sollesnes, Harald Blø & Jon Flølo
Second Violin – Elisabeth Svanes, Elna Føleide Selle, Geir Atle Stangenes & Gunnvor Holtlien

Notes 
Recorded live July 19, 2000, at Molde Domirke during the Molde Jazzfestival

References

ECM Records albums
Terje Rypdal albums
2002 albums
Albums produced by Manfred Eicher